New England Emmy Awards are a division of the National Academy of Television Arts and Sciences. The division was founded in 1977 and in addition to granting the New England Emmy Awards, it recognizes awards scholarships, honors industry veterans at the Silver Circle Celebration, conducts National Student Television Awards of Excellence, has a free research and a nationwide job bank. The chapter also participates in judging Emmy entries at the regional and national levels.

Boundaries

The academy is divided into the following boundaries and encompasses Maine, Massachusetts, New Hampshire, Rhode Island, Vermont and the majority of Connecticut excluding Fairfield County. These boundaries are responsible for the submission of television broadcast materials presented for awards considerations.

Board of governors 

Each year the membership of the National Academy of Television Arts & Sciences New England Chapter elects new professionals on rotating Board of Governors to represent the chapter. While best known for The EMMY Awards and Silver Circle, which recognize outstanding achievements in the industry, NATAS New England also represents an array of other events available to their membership.

References

Regional Emmy Awards
Awards established in 1977
1977 establishments in the United States
Television in Massachusetts